José Juan Arredondo (born March 12, 1984) is a Dominican former professional baseball relief pitcher. He also played for the Los Angeles Angels of Anaheim and the Cincinnati Reds of the Major League Baseball (MLB).

Playing career

Los Angeles Angels of Anaheim
Arredondo was signed as a non-drafted free agent by the Angels on June 25, 2002.

2008 season
Arredondo made his MLB debut against the Chicago White Sox on May 14, at Angel Stadium in Anaheim, California. He surrendered a home run to Nick Swisher, the first batter he ever faced.

Arredondo earned his first career MLB victory on May 26, 2008, against the Detroit Tigers in Anaheim, throwing two perfect innings of relief in an Angels' 1–0 12-inning victory. On June 28, he pitched in relief of Jered Weaver and combined with Weaver to not allow a hit against the Los Angeles Dodgers, but still lost the game 1–0. This was only the fourth time an eight-inning no-hitter had ever been lost due to the home team winning the game, and the first as a combined no-hitter. Because the Angels did not pitch nine innings, it is not officially considered a no-hitter.

Arredondo finished the season with a 10–2 record and a 1.62 ERA. He was considered to be a potential closer until the Angels signed Brian Fuentes.

2009 season
Although Arredondo came off a stellar 2008 rookie season, he struggled in spring training with diminished velocity and poor control. Following a rough start to the 2009 season, Arredondo was optioned to the Angels' Triple-A affiliate, the Salt Lake Bees, on June 10. Soon after, an MRI revealed a sprained ligament in his elbow.

After a few sporadic appearances in July and August for the Angels, the Angels management asked Arredondo to train at the team's camp in Arizona in case he was needed for the playoffs. "Arredondo chose not to, heading home to the Dominican instead", Orange County Register's Bill Plunkett reported. "It was a decision Reagins admitted 'surprised' if not disappointed the organization." His history of elbow injury and behavior issues, "seriously dented his standing with the Angels", wrote Plunkett, "and calls into question his future with the organization."

On December 10, 2009, the Angels announced that Arredondo would have Tommy John elbow reconstruction and would miss the entire 2010 season. Just two days later, on December 12, the Angels announced they would not offer Arredondo a contract for 2010.

Cincinnati Reds

2010
On January 22, 2010, Arredondo signed a minor league contract with the Cincinnati Reds. He underwent Tommy John surgery (UCL reconstruction) in February and spent the summer of 2010 training at the Reds' facility in Goodyear, Arizona. On July 23, 2010, the Reds purchased the contract of Arredondo and placed him on the 60-day DL after designating Corky Miller for assignment.

2011
Arredondo was with the Reds during spring training, but was placed on the 15-day DL to start the season so he could fully recover from his Tommy John surgery. He began his rehab assignment on April 11, and was activated from the DL on May 14. Mike Leake was optioned for the first time in his career to free up the spot for Arredondo. Arredondo posted a 3.04 ERA through his first 24 games, despite having control problems early on and walking 22 batters in his first 24 games. After pitching on July 6 against the Cardinals, Arredondo had forearm pain in his right arm. He was unavailable in the final series before the All-Star break, and on July 15 he was placed on the DL, retroactive to July 7. The Reds recalled lefty Jeremy Horst.  On July 29, in his first career major league at bat, Arredóndo, after pitching a perfect 13th against the Giants, singled to set up Édgar Rentería's game-ending hit.

York Revolution
Arredondo signed with the York Revolution of the Atlantic League of Professional Baseball on March 18, 2016.  He resigned with York on March 1, 2017. He was released on July 16, 2017.

Pitching style
Arrendondo throws four pitches, the primary one being a splitter averaging about 85 mph. He also throws a four-seam fastball (90–92), a two-seam fastball (89-91), and a slider to right-handers (82–85). With 2 strikes, Arredondo throws splitters the great majority of the time.

References

External links

1984 births
Living people
Arizona League Angels players
Arkansas Travelers players
Cincinnati Reds players
Dominican Republic expatriate baseball players in the United States

Los Angeles Angels players
Louisville Bats players
Major League Baseball pitchers
Major League Baseball players from the Dominican Republic
Orem Owlz players
Sportspeople from San Pedro de Macorís
Rancho Cucamonga Quakes players
Salt Lake Bees players
World Baseball Classic players of the Dominican Republic
York Revolution players
2009 World Baseball Classic players